Olympus, or Chionistra, ( or Χιονίστρα) at , is the highest point in Cyprus. It is located in the Troodos Mountains of Cyprus.  Mount Olympus peak and the "Troodos Square" fall under the territory of Platres in Limassol District. A British long range radar currently operates at Mount Olympus' peak. It has a highland warm-summer mediterranean climate.

The Mount Olympus Ski resort consists of the Sun Valley and North Face areas. Each area has its own ski lifts and runs, operated by the Cyprus Ski Club:

 Aphrodite or Sun Valley I, with a 125m T-bar ski lift and beginner-level slopes
 Hermes or Sun Valley II, with a 140m T-bar ski lift and intermediate-level slopes
 Dias/Zeus or North Face I, with a 380m chairlift and advanced-level slopes
 Hera or North Face II, with a 262m T-bar ski lift and beginner-level slopes
In the Sun Valley area there is a 55m rope tow baby lift as well.

Writing in the late first century BC or first century AD, the geographer Strabo reported that on one of its promontories was a temple to Aphrodite Acraea which means Aphrodite of the Heights, which women were forbidden to enter.

See also
 List of elevation extremes by country

References

External links
Troodos Tourism Board
Cyprus Ski Federation & Club
Webcam on the North side of Mount Olympus

Ski areas and resorts in Cyprus
Olympus
One-thousanders of Cyprus
Temples of Aphrodite
Troodos Mountains
Highest points of countries